MalJohn Gustave "Red" Fisher (June 22, 1887 – January 31, 1940) was a Major League Baseball left fielder who played in  with the St. Louis Browns.

External links

1887 births
1940 deaths
Major League Baseball left fielders
Baseball players from Pittsburgh
St. Louis Browns players
Minor league baseball managers
Indianapolis Indians players
Boone Greyhounds players
Fort Dodge Gypsumites players
Oskaloosa Quakers players
Sioux City Packers players
Omaha Rourkes players
Louisville Colonels (minor league) players
Pittsburgh Filipinos players
Jersey City Skeeters players
Scranton Miners players
Beaumont Oilers players
Mitchell Kernels players
Muskegon Anglers players
Huron Packers players